Tamboril, Ceará is a municipality in the state of Ceará in the Northeast region of Brazil. It has an area of about 2046.6 km², and is located at a latitude of 04º49'56" South and longitude  40º19'14" West, at an altitude of 322 meters.  The estimated population of Tamboril in 2020 was 26,225.

Tamboril contains 8 districts:

 Boa Esperança
 Carvalho
 Curatis
 Holanda
 Oliveiras
 Sucesso
 Açudinho
 Tamboril (Main district)

Tamboril is about 54 kilometers away from the municipality of Crateús, the regional capital of Ceará.

See also
List of municipalities in Ceará

References

Municipalities in Ceará